The Vilayet of the Danube or Danubian Vilayet (Dunavska(ta) oblast, more commonly Дунавски вилает, Danube Vilayet) was a first-level administrative division (vilayet) of the Ottoman Empire from 1864 to 1878.

The vilayet was created from the northern parts of Silistra Province along the Danube River and eyalets of Niš, Vidin and Silistra. This vilayet was meant to become a model province, showcasing all the progress achieved by the Porte through the modernising Tanzimat reforms. Other vilayets modelled on the vilayet of the Danube were ultimately established throughout the empire by 1876, with the exception of the Arabian Peninsula and the by then semi-independent Egypt. Rusçuk, today Ruse in Bulgaria, was chosen as the capital of the vilayet due to its position as a key Ottoman port on the Danube.

The province disappeared after the Russo-Turkish War of 1877–78, when its north-eastern part (Northern Dobruja) was incorporated into Romania, some of its western territories into Serbia, while the central and southern regions made up most of the autonomous Principality of Bulgaria and a part of Eastern Rumelia.

Government
Midhat Pasha was the first governor of the vilayet (1864–1868). During his time as a governor, steamship lines were established on the Danube River; the Ruse-Varna railroad was completed; agricultural credit cooperatives providing farmers with low-interest loans were introduced; tax incentives were also offered to encourage new industrial enterprises.

The first official vilayet newspaper in the Ottoman Empire, Tuna/Dunav, was published in both Ottoman Turkish and Bulgarian and had both Ottoman and Bulgarian editors. Its editors in chief included Ismail Kemal and Ahmed Midhat Efendi.

The vilayet had an Administrative Assembly that included state officials appointed by the Ottoman government as well as six representatives (three Muslims and three non-Muslims) elected from among the inhabitants of the province. Non-Muslims also participated in the provincial criminal and commercial courts that were based on a secular code of law and justice. Mixed Muslim-Christian schools were also introduced, but this reform was abolished after it was met by strong opposition by the populace.

Governors

Governors of the Vilayet:
 Hafiz Ahmed Midhat Shefik Pasha (October 1864 - March 1868)
 Mehmed Sabri Pasha (March 1868 - December 1868)
 Arnavud Mehmed Akif Pasha (February 1869 - October 1870)
 Kücük ömer Fevzi Pasha (October 1870 - October 1871)
 Ahmed Rasim Pasha (October 1871 - June 1872)
 Ahmed Hamdi Pasha (June 1872 - April 1873)
 Abdurrahman Nureddin Pasha (April 1873 - April 1874)
 Mehmed Asim Pasha (April 1874 - September 1876)
 Halil Rifat Pasha (October 1876 - February 1877)
 Oman Mazhar Ahmed (1876–1877)

Administrative divisions 
The province included the following sanjaks:
 Sanjak of Tulcea
 Sanjak of Varna
 Sanjak of Ruse
 Sanjak of Tărnovo
 Sanjak of Vidin
 Sanjak of Sofia
 Sanjak of Niš

The Danube Province was founded in 1864 and consisted the subprovinces of Ruse, Varna, Tulcea, Tarnovo, Vidin, Sofia and Niş. Two subprovinces (Sofia and Niş) were separated from the Danube Province, so that Niş sanjak was part of Prizren Vilayet in 1869-1874, while the detached Sofia Province was founded in 1876, and finally both Sofia and Niş were annexed to Adrianople and Kosovo Vilayets respectively in 1877.

Demographics
In 1865, 658,600 (40.51%) Muslims and 967,058 (59.49%) non-Muslims, including females, were living in the province (excluding Niş sanjak); some 569,868 (34.68%) Muslims, apart from the immigrants and 1.073.496 (65,32%) non-Muslims in 1859-1860. Some 250000-300000 Muslim immigrants from Crimea and Caucasus had been settled in this region from 1855 to 1864.

Male population of the Danube Vilayet in 1866:

Male Population of the Danube Vilayet (excluding Niş sancak) in 1865 according to Kuyûd-ı Atîk (the Danube Vilayet printing press):

Male Population of the Danube Vilayet (excluding Niş sanjak) in 1866-1873 according to the editor of the Danube newspaper Ismail Kemal:

Male Population of the Danube Vilayet (excluding Niş sancak) in 1868 according to Kemal Karpat:

According to the 1874 census, there were 963596 (42,22%) Muslims and 1318506 (57,78%) non-Muslims in the Danube Province excluding Nış sanjak. Together with the sanjak of Nish the population consisted of 1055650 (40,68%) Muslims and 1539278 (59,32%) non-Muslims in 1874. Muslims were the majority in the sanjaks of Rusçuk, Varna and Tulça, while the non-Muslims were in majority in the rest of the sanjaks.

Male Population of the Danube Vilayet (excluding Niş sanjak) in 1875 according to Tahrir-i Cedid (the Danube Vilayet printing press):

Male Population of the Danube Vilayet in 1876 according to the Ottoman officer Stanislas Saint Clair:

Total population of the Danube Vilayet (including Niş and Sofia sanjaks) according to the 1876 edition of Encyclopaedia Britannica:

Total Population of the Danube Vilayet (excluding Niş sanjak) in 1876 estimated by the French counsel Aubaret from the register:

References

External links
 

Vilayets of the Ottoman Empire in Europe
Modern history of Ukraine
Ottoman period in the history of Bulgaria
Ottoman period in Romania
Ottoman Serbia
1860s in the Ottoman Empire
1870s in the Ottoman Empire
States and territories established in 1864
1864 establishments in the Ottoman Empire
1878 disestablishments in the Ottoman Empire